Ethiopia competed in the 2008 Summer Olympics held in Beijing, People's Republic of China from August 8 to August 24, 2008.

10,000 m runner Tirunesh Dibaba ran the second fastest 10,000 metres of all time, setting an Olympic record of 29 minutes, 54.66 seconds.

Medalists

Athletics

The Ethiopian track and field team was announced on July 13, 2008.

Men

Women

Key
Note–Ranks given for track events are within the athlete's heat only
Q = Qualified for the next round
q = Qualified for the next round as a fastest loser or, in field events, by position without achieving the qualifying target
NR = National record
N/A = Round not applicable for the event
Bye = Athlete not required to compete in round

References

Nations at the 2008 Summer Olympics
2008
Summer Olympics